Lajos Haraszthy (23 March 1885 – 4 December 1937) was a Hungarian rower. He competed in the men's eight event at the 1908 Summer Olympics.

References

External links
 

1885 births
1937 deaths
Hungarian male rowers
Olympic rowers of Hungary
Rowers at the 1908 Summer Olympics
Rowers from Budapest